Loyola College, Belo Horizonte is a kindergarten through secondary school in Minas Gerais state, Brazil, opened by the Society of Jesus in 1943. It is maintained by the Nobrega Association for Education and Social Assistance.

History
The archbishop of the Belo Horizonte, Antonio dos Santos Cabral, initiated the school and requested the Society of Jesus to run it. At the beginning, there were only 33 students and Jesuit priest-teachers Caesar Dainese and Paul Nacca. The first girls were admitted 17 years later.

On 19 March 19, 1943 Loyola College, dedicated to the Sacred Heart of Jesus, was officially opened. At the time, it was based at 1216 Rua Gonçalves Avenue. In 1949 Loyola College moved to 7919 Contorno Avenue in the Garden City neighbourhood.

See also
 List of Jesuit sites

References  

Jesuit schools in Brazil
Catholic primary schools in Brazil
Educational institutions established in 1943
1943 establishments in Brazil
Catholic secondary schools in Brazil